RMS Trent was a British Royal Mail paddle steamer built in 1841 by William Pitcher of Northfleet for the Royal Mail Steam Packet Company.  She measured 1,856 gross tons and could carry 60 passengers. She was one of four ships constructed at Blackwall, all named after some of the principal rivers of England. The others were the Thames, Medway and Isis.

Commander Edward C. Miller R.N. was appointed to take out the mails from Southampton on 1 March 1842.

Trent served the transatlantic passenger route until she was requisitioned by the British government on the outbreak of the Crimean War in 1854 for use as a troopship. She returned to her former civilian service in 1856.

Her interception by  during the American Civil War in November 1861  provoked the Trent Affair, also known as the Mason and Slidell Affair, which almost led to war between the United Kingdom and the United States.

Trent continued in service until 1865, when she was sold and subsequently scrapped.

References

External links
 
 A picture of Trent
 Trent at Ships of the World archive link.

Paddle steamers of the United Kingdom
Ships of the Royal Mail Steam Packet Company
Ships built in Northfleet